This is a partial list of circulars and bulletins issued by the Office of Management and Budget (OMB) within the Executive Office of the President of the United States.

Circulars
Circular A-4: Requires federal agencies to identify why regulation is needed, consider a reasonable number of alternative regulatory approaches, and for each alternative conduct a rigorous and objective benefit-cost analysis
Circular A-11: Preparation, submission, and execution of the budget, revised and reissued periodically
Circular A-16: Creation, maintenance and use of spatial data
Circular A-21: Costs in support of sponsored research, development and training
Circular A-119 relates to federal participation in the development and use of voluntary consensus standards and in conformity assessment activities. It was originally published on 20 October 1993, and was updated on 10 February 1998 
Circular A-123: Management responsibilities for internal controls in federal agencies
Circular A-126: Improving the management and use of government aircraft
Circular A-130: Managing information as a strategic resource
Circular A-131: Value Engineering, issued 26 January 1988, revised 21 May 1993  and 26 December 2013. Contains guidance to support the sustained use of value engineering by federal departments and agencies
Circular A-133: Audits of states, local government and non-profit organizations: see OMB A-133 Compliance Supplement

OMB Bulletins with multi-year effect 

Most OMB Bulletins are intended to have relevance in only a single fiscal year. A few have longer lifetimes, including:

 OMB Bulletin M20-01, Revised Delineations of Metropolitan Statistical Areas, Micropolitan Statistical Areas, and Combined Statistical Areas, and Guidance on Uses of Delineations of These Areas
 OMB Bulletin No. 17-03, Audit Requirements for Federal Financial Statements
 OMB Bulletin M07-02, Bulletin for Agency Good Guidance Practices, 72 Fed. Reg. 43432 (Jan. 25, 2007)
 OMB Bulletin M05-03, Information Quality Bulletin for Peer Review
 OMB Bulletin B01-09, Form and Content of Agency Financial Statements

External links
 List of OMB circulars
 List of OMB Bulletins

References

United States Office of Management and Budget
Publications of the United States government
Government-related lists